Pawłowice  (German Pawlowitz) is a large village in Pszczyna County, Silesian Voivodeship, in southern Poland. It is the seat of the gmina (administrative district) called Gmina Pawłowice.

The village has a population of 9,929 making it the third largest village in Poland.

History
The village was first mentioned in 1281.

During the political upheaval caused by Matthias Corvinus the land around Pszczyna was overtaken by Casimir II, Duke of Cieszyn, who sold it in 1517 to the Hungarian magnates of the Thurzó family, forming the Pless state country. In the accompanying sales document issued on 21 February 1517 the village was mentioned as Pawlowicze. The Kingdom of Bohemia in 1526 became part of the Habsburg monarchy. In the War of the Austrian Succession most of Silesia was conquered by the Kingdom of Prussia, including the village, but Pawłowice, however, were mostly inhabited by Poles. In the Upper Silesia plebiscite in 1921, as many as 74% of the inhabitants of Pawłowice voted for joining Poland. In 1922, Pawłowice was incorporated into the reborn Poland. In 1939-1945, the Germans occupied Pawłowice, but the village was liberated in 1945 and returned to Poland.

References

Villages in Pszczyna County